The Mayfield Clothiers was the primary moniker of the minor league baseball teams based in Mayfield, Kentucky that played from 1922 to 1924 and 1936–1955 (with a break from 1942 to 1945 when the league was shut down during World War II). The Mayfield teams played exclusively in the Class D level Kentucky–Illinois–Tennessee League ("KITTY League").

Notable alumni

 Floyd Baker (1938)
 Dave Garcia (1955)
 Walter Holke (1937)
 Larry Kennedy (1938)
 Charlie Metro (1938)
 Clarence Mitchell (1937)
 Jim Russell (1938)
 Bob Skinner (1951) 3 x MLB All-Star
 Bennie Tate (1938)
 Vern Stephens (1938) 8 x MLB All-Star

External links
 Pictures of the team's ballpark

Defunct baseball teams in Kentucky
Defunct minor league baseball teams
Graves County, Kentucky
Kentucky-Illinois-Tennessee League
New York Giants minor league affiliates
Pittsburgh Pirates minor league affiliates
St. Louis Browns minor league affiliates
Brooklyn Dodgers minor league affiliates
Professional baseball teams in Kentucky
1936 establishments in Kentucky
1955 disestablishments in Kentucky
Baseball teams established in 1936
Baseball teams disestablished in 1955
Kentucky-Illinois-Tennessee League teams